Sutherland Grange is a   Local Nature Reserve on the northern outskirts of Dedworth, a suburb of Windsor in Berkshire. It is owned and managed by the Royal Borough of Windsor and Maidenhead.

Geography and site
The nature reserve is Meadow land.

History

There is a large late Victorian house on the site, called 'Sutherland Grange' with the original name retained.

In 1999 the site was declared as a local nature reserve by the Royal Borough of Windsor & Maidenhead.

References

Parks and open spaces in Berkshire
Nature reserves in Berkshire
Local Nature Reserves in Berkshire